The 1990 Sanremo Open was a men's tennis tournament played on outdoor clay courts held in Sanremo, Italy that was part of the World Series of the 1991 ATP Tour. It was the only edition of the tournament and was held from 30 July to 6 August 1991. Seventh-seeded Jordi Arrese won the singles title.

Finals

Singles

 Jordi Arrese defeated  Juan Aguilera, 6–2, 6–2 
Arrese won his 3rd career title and his 1st title of the year.

Doubles

 Mihnea-Ion Năstase /  Goran Prpić defeated  Ola Jonsson /  Fredrik Nilsson 3–6, 7–6, 6–3

References

1990 ATP Tour
1990 in Italian tennis
Tennis in Italy